Salvador Gjonaj (born 26 September 1992) is an Albanian footballer who currently plays as a midfielder for KF Oriku. He has also been a member of the Albanian U-21s.

References

External links
 Profile - FSHF

1992 births
Living people
People from Laç
Association football midfielders
Albanian footballers
Albania youth international footballers
KF Laçi players
KF Adriatiku Mamurrasi players
FK Tomori Berat players
KS Iliria players
KS Pogradeci players
KS Kastrioti players
KS Egnatia Rrogozhinë players
KS Burreli players
KF Oriku players
Kategoria Superiore players
Kategoria e Parë players